General elections were held in Pakistan on 25 February 1985 to elect members of the National Assembly. The elections were held under the military government of Muhammad Zia-ul-Haq after the restoration of the 1973 constitution.

Around 1,300 candidates contested the elections, which were held on a nonpartisan basis. Each candidate was required to have their nomination paper signed by 50 registered voters from the constituency they wished to stand in. In an attempt to disqualify a large number of opposition candidates and secure a conservative leadership, Zia-ul-Haq introduced amendments to the Political Parties Act of 1962. As a result, the Movement for the Restoration of Democracy (MRD), which was calling for an end to the military regime, boycotted the elections.

Voter turnout was 52.93%, considerably lower than the previous two elections. Most of the elected MNAs were supporters of the Zia regime. A new government was formed under the leadership of Muhammad Khan Junejo, a lesser known figure in national politics. Prime Minister Junejo and his followers subsequently established the pro-Zia conservative Pakistan Muslim League.

Results

Aftermath
Following the elections, Muhammad Khan Junejo was appointed Prime Minister and later formed a new party, the Pakistan Muslim League. The election boycott was viewed to have been a misstep for the MRD, which had assumed the public would support its stance.

References

Pakistan
1985 elections in Pakistan
General elections in Pakistan
Non-partisan elections
Military government of Pakistan (1977–1988)
Election and referendum articles with incomplete results